The 1st Anti-Aircraft Division was an Imperial Japanese Army unit of World War II. It was responsible for the anti-aircraft guns and searchlight units assigned to defend cities in the central region of Honshu.

History

At the start of the Pacific War, the Eastern District Army included the Eastern Anti-Aircraft Brigade, which was one of two such units in the Imperial Japanese Army responsible for homeland air defence. It was equipped with around 150 anti-aircraft guns, most of which were obsolete, and its personnel were poorly trained. As a result of the Doolittle Raid in April 1942, on 19 November that year a major reorganisation of the Army's homeland air defence units took place. This reform saw the Eastern Anti-Aircraft Brigade replaced by the Eastern Air Defence Headquarters. The size of this force was expanded from April 1944 as part of a broader expansion of the homeland air defence units. However, these units were affected by shortages of anti-aircraft guns. By June 1944 the Eastern Air Defence Headquarters controlled 300 anti-aircraft guns.

In December 1944 the 1st Anti-Aircraft Division was established to command the Eastern District Army's air defence units. Three other anti-aircraft divisions were also established at this time. The 1st Anti-Aircraft Division was much larger than the other such divisions, and comprised eight anti-aircraft regiments, six independent anti-aircraft battalions, four machine cannon companies and a regiment equipped with searchlights.

The 1st Anti-Aircraft Division saw extensive combat while trying to contest the Allied air raids on Japan. This included protecting Tokyo from attack, during which it was involved in the devastating raid against the city on the night of 9/10 March 1945. By the end of the war in August 1945, the division claimed to have shot down 193 Boeing B-29 Superfortress heavy bombers and damaged 454. These claims considerably over-stated the division's actual achievements, as like the other anti-aircraft divisions its performance was greatly limited by shortages of equipment.

Structure

Upon formation in December 1944, the 1st Anti-Aircraft Division comprised the following units:
111st Anti-Aircraft Regiment
112nd Anti-Aircraft Regiment
113rd Anti-Aircraft Regiment
114th Anti-Aircraft Regiment
115th Anti-Aircraft Regiment
116th Anti-Aircraft Regiment
117th Anti-Aircraft Regiment
118th Anti-Aircraft Regiment
1st Independent Anti-Aircraft Battalion 
2nd Independent Anti-Aircraft Battalion 
3rd Independent Anti-Aircraft Battalion 
4th Independent Anti-Aircraft Battalion 
95th Field Anti-Aircraft Battalion
96th Field Anti-Aircraft Battalion
1st Machine Cannon Battalion
4th Machine Cannon Battalion
1st Searchlight Regiment

References
Citations

Works consulted
 
 

Military units and formations established in 1944
Military units and formations disestablished in 1945
1944 establishments in Japan
1945 disestablishments in Japan
Japanese World War II divisions
Air defence divisions